Eva Isabel Marion Primrose, Countess of Rosebery and Midlothian  ( Bruce; 17 June 1892 – 29 January 1987) was the daughter of Henry Bruce, 2nd Baron Aberdare and his wife, Constance.

Personal life
Eva Isabel Marion Bruce married, firstly, Algernon Strutt, 3rd Baron Belper on 26 April 1911 in St. Margaret's, Westminster. The couple were divorced in 1922 after having three children:
Alexander Ronald George, later 4th Baron Belper (1912-1999)
 Hon. Michael Strutt (1914-1942) 
 Hon. Lavinia Mary Strutt (1916-1995)

She married, secondly, to Harry Primrose, 6th Earl of Rosebery, on 24 June 1924 and they had one son:
 Neil Archibald, later 7th Earl of Rosebery (b. 1929)

She was the mother-in-law of Bernard Fitzalan-Howard, 16th Duke of Norfolk who married her daughter, Lavinia Strutt, in 1937. She died on 29 January 1987, aged 94.

Honours
She held the office of Justice of the Peace (JP) for Buckinghamshire. She was invested as a Dame Commander of the Order of the British Empire (DBE) in 1955. She was awarded an honorary doctorate of Laws (LL.D) from the University of Edinburgh in 1957. She was decorated with the Chevalier of the Legion of Honour.

References

Sources
 Charles Mosley, editor, Burke's Peerage and Baronetage, 106th edition, 2 volumes (Crans, Switzerland: Burke's Peerage (Genealogical Books) Ltd., 1999), volume 1, page 9.
 Peter W. Hammond, editor, The Complete Peerage or a History of the House of Lords and All its Members From the Earliest Times, Volume XIV: Addenda & Corrigenda (Stroud, Gloucestershire: Sutton Publishing, 1998), page 86. 
 Charles Mosley, editor, Burke's Peerage, Baronetage & Knightage, 107th edition, 3 volumes (Wilmington, Delaware:Burke's Peerage (Genealogical Books) Ltd., 2003), volume 1, page 340.

1892 births
1987 deaths
Midlothian
Scottish countesses
Dames Commander of the Order of the British Empire
Daughters of barons
English justices of the peace
Place of birth missing
Place of death missing
Belper
Eva
Wives of knights